Kononovskaya is a rural locality (a village) in Ustyansky District, Arkhangelsk Oblast, Russia. The population was 86 as of 2012. There are 7 streets.

Geography 
It is located on the Ustya River.

References 

Rural localities in Ustyansky District